Felimare samueli is a species of sea slug or dorid nudibranch, a marine gastropod mollusc in the family Chromodorididae.

Distribution 

References

Chromodorididae
Gastropods described in 2012